Baron Dickinson, of Painswick in the County of Gloucester, is a title in the Peerage of the United Kingdom. It was created on 18 January 1930 for the Liberal politician Willoughby Dickinson, who had previously represented St Pancras North in the House of Commons. He was the son of Sebastian Dickinson, Member of Parliament for Stroud from 1868 to 1874.  the title is held by the first Baron's great grandson, the third Baron, who succeeded in 2019.

Frances Davidson, Viscountess Davidson, daughter of the first Baron, was a Conservative Member of Parliament and was given a life peerage as Baroness Northchurch in 1964.

The second Baron lived in Painswick and was the director of the Painswick Garden Estate and a trustee of the Painswick Rococo Garden Trust. He was the eldest son of Hon. Richard Sebastian Willoughby Dickinson, only son of the first Baron.

Very Rev. Hon. Hugh Dickinson, Dean of Salisbury from 1986 until 1996, was the younger grandson of the first Baron. Award-winning author Peter Dickinson was younger brother of the second Baron.

Barons Dickinson (1930)
Willoughby Hyett Dickinson, 1st Baron Dickinson (1859–1943)
Hon. Richard Sebastian Willoughby Dickinson (1897–1935)
Richard Clavering Hyett Dickinson, 2nd Baron Dickinson (1926–2019)
Martin Hyett Dickinson, 3rd Baron Dickinson (b. 1961)

The heir presumptive is the present holder's brother the Hon. Andrew Dickinson (b. 1963)

Arms

References

Kidd, Charles, Williamson, David (editors). Debrett's Peerage and Baronetage (1990 edition). New York: St Martin's Press, 1990, 

Baronies in the Peerage of the United Kingdom
Noble titles created in 1930
Noble titles created for UK MPs
Hyett family